Defending champion Shingo Kunieda defeated Stéphane Houdet in the final, 6–7(4–7), 6–3, 6–2 to win the men's singles wheelchair tennis title at the 2015 US Open. It was his sixth US Open singles title and 20th major singles title overall.

Seeds

Draw

Bracket

External links 

 Draw

Wheelchair Men's Singles
U.S. Open, 2015 Men's Singles